Muhammad bin Yahya (1898-1932) also known as al-Badr, was a Yemeni poet and politician. He was the son of Yahya Muhammad Hamid ed-Din. He served as the leader of the Sharaf Liwa and Hudaydah Liwa. He drowned in the Red Sea when he was trying to save the life of one of his servants.
The Egyptian poet Ahmed Shawqi recited his death with an ode.

References

Yemeni politicians
1898 births
Deaths by drowning
1932 deaths
Sons of kings